Ceratiocaris is a genus of paleozoic phyllocarid crustaceans whose fossils are found in marine strata from the Upper Ordovician until the genus' extinction during the Silurian. They are typified by eight short thoracic segments, seven longer abdominal somites and an elongated pretelson somite. Their carapace is slightly oval shaped; they have many ridges parallel to the ventral margin and possess a horn at the anterior end. They are well known from the Silurian Eramosa formation of Ontario, Canada.

The following species are included:
Ceratiocaris bohemica Barrande, 1872
Ceratiocaris harpago Poschmann, Bergmann & Kühl, 2018
Ceratiocaris macroura Collette & Rudkin, 2010
Ceratiocaris monroei Salter in Murchison, 1859
Ceratiocaris murchisoni Jones & Woodward, 1888
Ceratiocaris papilio Salter in Murchison, 1859
Ceratiocaris pusilla Matthew, 1889
Ceratiocaris solenoides  M'Coy, 1849
Ceratiocaris winneshiekensis Briggs et al., 2016

References

Prehistoric Malacostraca
Prehistoric crustacean genera
Ordovician arthropods
Silurian animals
Fossils of Canada
Paleontology in Ontario
Bertie Formation
Paleozoic life of New Brunswick